The 153d Air Refueling Squadron is a unit of the Mississippi Air National Guard 186th Air Refueling Wing located at Key Field Air National Guard Base, Mississippi. The 153d is equipped with the KC-135 Stratotanker aircraft.

The squadron is a descendant organization of the 153d Observation Squadron, one of the 29 original National Guard Observation Squadrons of the United States Army National Guard formed before World War II.

Overview
The squadrons aircraft are eight KC-135R Stratotankers.  The mission of the squadron is to provide air refueling support to major commands of the United States Air Force, as well as other U.S. military forces and the military forces of allied nations.

History

World War II
Activated as part of the Mississippi National Guard in 1939 by the National Guard Bureau.  Equipped with Douglas O-38 observation aircraft.  Ordered to active service on 15 October 1940 as part of the buildup of the Army Air Corps prior to the United States entry into World War II. After the Japanese attack on Pearl Harbor, was attached to Army Air Forces Antisubmarine Command, performed anti-submarine patrols over the Gulf of Mexico until August 1943 when the mission was turned over to the United States Navy.

Transferred to the European Theater of Operations (ETO), August 1943.  Assigned to Ninth Air Force as a photographic reconnaissance unit.   After the Normandy Invasion in June 1944, because a liaison and courier unit flying light aircraft until the end of the war in Europe.  Inactivated during December 1945 in Germany.

Mississippi Air National Guard

The squadron was re-designated as the 153d Fighter Squadron and allotted to the Mississippi Air National Guard, on 24 May 1946. It was organized at Key Field, Meridian, Mississippi and was extended federal recognition on 12 September. The squadron was equipped with F-47D Thunderbolts and was allocated to the Fourteenth Air Force, Continental Air Command by the National Guard Bureau.

The unit was called to active federal service on 1 March 1951. This activation temporarily resulted in the dissolution of the Mississippi Air National Guard, as members were sent to various places, including for many, duty in the Korean War. The squadron was sent to Turner AFB, Georgia where it was assigned to the federalized 108th Fighter-Bomber Group with a mission to provide fighter escorts to Strategic Air Command B-50 Superfortress bombers on training missions. In December 1951 it was moved to Godman AFB, Kentucky where it replaced a unit deployed to England. It was released from active duty and returned to Mississippi state control on 10 November 1952.

Reformed in December 1952, being equipped with RF-51D Mustang reconnaissance aircraft.  Performed tactical reconnaissance for Tactical Air Command, retiring the Mustangs in 1955 and flying RF-80C Shooting Star aircraft until 1956.  Re-equipped with RF-84F Thunderflash reconnaissance aircraft.

At the height of the Cold War in 1961, the squadron was federalized as a result of tensions concerning the Berlin Wall. Part of the squadron remained at Key Field in an active-duty status for about a year before being released.

On 15 October 1962, the 153d was authorized to expand to a group level, and the 186th Tactical Reconnaissance Group was established by the National Guard Bureau. The 153d TRS becoming the group's flying squadron. Other squadrons assigned into the group were the 186th Headquarters, 186th Material Squadron (Maintenance), 186th Combat Support Squadron, and the 186th USAF Dispensary.   In 1970 Tactical Air Command retired the RF-84s and they were replaced by the RF-101C Voodoo.  In 1979 the Voodoos were again replaced by RF-4C Phantom IIs.  RF-101C 56-0166, on display at the National Museum of the United States Air Force, served with the 186th TRG. The aircraft was flown directly from Key Field to the Wright-Patterson Air Force Base, Ohio on its final flight 27 October 1978.

In 1990 during the Gulf Crisis, several aircraft and support personnel were activated and deployed to Doha International Airport, Qatar, being part of the 35th Tactical Fighter Wing (Provisional) during Operation Desert Shield, Operation Desert Storm.

In 1992 the squadron's 186th Tactical Reconnaissance Group was realigned to an air refueling unit as the RF-4Cs were retired.  The squadron was equipped with KC-135 Stratotankers and placed initially under Air Combat Command, later under Air Mobility Command.   The 153d Air Refueling Squadron has seen worldwide duty with the KC-135s, supporting Operation Display Determination, Operation Provide Relief, Operation Restore Hope, Operation Support Justice, Operation Deny Flight, Operation Northern Watch, Operation Noble Eagle, Operation Enduring Freedom and Operation Iraqi Freedom.

Lineage
 Designated 153d Observation Squadron, and allotted to Mississippi NG, on 18 August 1939
 Activated on 27 September 1939
 Ordered to active service on 15 October 1940
 Re-designated: 153d Observation Squadron (Light) on 13 January 1942
 Re-designated: 153d Observation Squadron on 4 July 1942
 Re-designated: 153d Liaison Squadron on 31 May 1943.
 Inactivated on 15 December 1945
 Re-designated 153d Fighter Squadron, and allotted to Mississippi ANG, on 24 May 1946.
 Extended federal recognition on 12 September 1946
 Federalized and placed on active duty, 1 March 1951
 Re-designated: 153d Fighter-Escort Squadron 1 March 1951
 Re-designated: 153d Fighter-Bomber Squadron on 11 December 1951
 Released from active duty and returned to Mississippi state control, 30 November 1952
 Re-designated: 153d Tactical Reconnaissance Squadron on 1 December 1952
 Federalized and placed on active duty, 1 October 1961
 Released from active duty and returned to Mississippi state control, 31 August 1962
 Re-designated: 153d Air Refueling Squadron on 1 April 1992

Assignments
 Mississippi National Guard, 27 September 1939
 Fourth Corps Area, 15 October 1940
 V Army Corps, c. Dec 1940
 67th Observation (later Reconnaissance; Tactical Reconnaissance) Group, 1 September 1941
 IX Fighter Command, 12 December 1943
 Attached to First Army, 4 Feb – 15 November 1944
 Ninth Air Force, 14 March 1944
 IX Tactical Air Command, 25 April 1944
 Attached to Twelfth Army Group, 15 November 1944 – 26 July 1945
 XII Tactical Air Command, 15 Jul – 15 December 1945
 Attached to Seventh Army after 26 July 1945
 116th Fighter Group, 12 September 1946
 108th Fighter-Interceptor Group, 1 March 1951 – 30 November 1952
 116th Fighter-Interceptor Group, 30 November 1952
 116th Fighter-Bomber Wing, 1 December 1952
 116th Fighter Group (Air Defense), 1 July 1955
 7117th Tactical Wing, 1 October 1961 – 31 August 1962
 Mississippi Air National Guard, 1 September 1962
 Gained by: Tactical Air Command
 186th Tactical Reconnaissance Group, 15 October 1962
 186th Air Refueling Group, 1 April 1992
 186th Operations Group, 1 June 1992 – present

Stations

 Meridian, Mississippi, 27 September 1939
 Bluethenthal Field, North Carolina, 16 December 1941
 Key Field, Mississippi, 28 January 1942
 Esler Field, Louisiana, 17 Feb – 12 August 1942
 RAF Membury, England, 7 September 1942
 RAF Keevil, England, 28 November 1942
 RAF Membury, England, 3 October 1943
 RAF Keevil, England, 28 November 1943
 RAF Erlestokes, England, 13 March 1944
 Vouilly, France, 18 June 1944
 Canisy, France, 6 August 1944
 St Pois, France, 11 August 1944
 Couteme, France, 23 August 1944
 Maillebois, France, 25 August 1944
 St Cyr, France, 2 September 1944
 Vuel, Belgium, 10 September 1944
 Ham, Belgium, 12 September 1944
 Stree (near Huy), Belgium, 16 September 1944
 Verviers, Belgium, 20 September 1944
 Spa, Belgium, 24 October 1944

 Olne, Belgium, c. 19 December 1944
 Operated from Liege, Belgium, 18–23 Dec 1944
 Tongres, Belgium, 22 December 1944
 Rutten (Russon), Belgium, 8 January 1945
 Operated from Tongres, Belgium, 18 January 1945
 Duren, Germany, 9 Man 1945
 Euskirchen, Germany, 16 March 1945
 Bad Godesberg, Germany, 30 March 1945
 Marburg, Germany, 5 April 1945
 Bad Wildungen, Germany, 15 April 1945
 Weimar, Germany, 24 April 1945
 Brunswick, Germany, 20 May 1945
 Augsburg, Germany, 4 June 1945
 Heidelberg, Germany, 25 Jul – 15 December 1945
 Key Field (later Meridian Regional Airport), 12 September 1946
 Designated: Key Field Air National Guard Base, Meridian, Mississippi, 1991 – present
 Operated from: Turner AFB, Georgia, Mar 1951
 Operated from: Godman AFB, Kentucky, 11 December 1951

Aircraft

 Douglas O-38, 1939–1941
 In addition to North American O-47, 1940–1942, and O-49 and Curtiss O-52 Owl, 1941–1942
 Included F-3A Havoc and F-6A Mustang in 1942; in addition to L-4 Sentinel, 1942–1944, and F-3A Havoc, 1943–1944
 Included Spitfire PR XI, 1942–1943, and DB-7 Boston, 1943
 L-5 Sentinel, 1944–1945
 F-47 Thunderbolt, 1946–1952
 RF-51D Mustang, 1952–1955

 RF-80 Shooting Star, 1955–1956
 RF-84F Thunderflash, 1956–1970
 RF-101C Voodoo, 1970–1979
 RF-4C Phantom II, 1978–1991
 KC-135 Stratotanker, 1992–2011
 C-26 Metroliner, 2007–present
 C-27J Spartan, 2011–2013
 KC-135R Stratotanker, 2013–present

Aircraft flying in this unit
KC-135
58-0059(R) (Jan'94)

See also

 List of observation squadrons of the United States Army National Guard

References
 Notes

Bibliography

 Hubbard, Gerard (June 1943). "Aircraft Insignia, Spirit of Youth". Vol. LXXXIII (No. 6) National Geographic, pp. 710–722

External links
 186th Air Refueling Wing History and Lineage
  186th Air Refueling Wing homepage
 186th Air Refueling Wing@globalsecurity.org

Squadrons of the United States Air National Guard
Meridian, Mississippi
Air refueling squadrons of the United States Air Force
Military units and formations in Mississippi